Lukáš Dlouhý and Pavel Vízner were the defending champions, but chose not to participate that year.

Marcelo Melo and André Sá won in the final 4–6, 6–2, [10–7], against Albert Montañés and Santiago Ventura.

Seeds

Draw

Draw

External links
Draw

Doubles